Synodus mundyi (Mundy's arrowtooth lizardfish) is a lizardfish of the family Synodontidae, found in the Hawaiian Islands, at depths of between 9 and 200 m.  Its length is between 15 and 28 cm.

Taxonomy
Synodus mundyi was previously identified as Synodus doaki by many authors, but Randall (2009) noted that Hawaiian specimens differ from S. doaki in the scale counts and numbers of anal rays, and named them S. mundyi, in honor of Bruce C. Mundy.

References

 

Synodontidae
Fish described in 2009
Fish of the Pacific Ocean